The Bank of Montserrat Limited is the only community bank operating in the island of Montserrat. It was incorporated on February 22, 1988 by Hensey Fenton, and officially offered its banking services to the public on May 3, 1988.

Ownership
The bank, which operates as an unlisted public company, is jointly owned by local investors and the Government of Montserrat. As of March 2018, the island's government owned approximately 63% of the bank's total outstanding stock. However, the government, under the Reuben Meade administration had expressed its intentions to fully divest their ownership stake in the bank.

Bruce Farara, a local businessman, is currently the largest individual shareholder in the Bank of Montserrat Limited. As of March 2018, he owns a 3.10% stake in the bank. The heirs of John Osborne, the island's 3rd Chief Minister, also collectively own a 2.44% stake in the bank.

Corporate affairs

Board of directors
Bank of Montserrat's board of directors consists of the following members:
 Dalton Lee, Chairman   
 John E. Ryan, Director   
 Bruce Farara, Director  
 Duleep Cheddie, Director  
 Beverly Mendes, Director  
 Venita Cabey, Director  
 Johanathan Johannes, Director  
 Fitzroy Buffonge, Director  
 John P. Osborne, Director  
 Robert Frederick, Director
 Ivan Browne, Director

External links
 Official Website

References

Banks of the Caribbean
Companies of Montserrat
Banks established in 1988
Banks of British Overseas Territories
1988 establishments in Montserrat